Nils Gustaf "Nisse" Holm (11 June 1922 − 30 December 2009) was a Finnish film editor. During his career, he worked as an editor in more than 50 films.  Since the 1950s, he mainly worked for television.

Partial filmography 

 Noita palaa elämään (1952)
 Kuningas kulkureitten (1953)
 Kummituskievari (1954)
 Elokuu (1956)
 Lasisydän (1959)
 Kaasua, komisario Palmu! (1961)
 Tähdet kertovat, komisario Palmu (1962)

References

External links 
 

1922 births
2009 deaths
Artists from Helsinki
Finnish film editors